Matthes Crest is an approximately mile-long fin of rock with two summits separated by a deep notch. It is a part of the Cathedral Range, which is a mountain range in the south-central portion of Yosemite National Park. The range is part of the Sierra Nevada.

History and geology 

Matthes crest is named for François E. Matthes, a cartographer and author who described the geology in the region where Matthes Crest lies. It was originally named Echo Ridge due to its proximity to the Echo Peaks. Matthes crest arose as a nunatak in the glacial field which covered Tuolumne during the last ice age.

Climbing 

The first known ascent of Matthes Crest was by Jules Eichorn, Glen Dawson, and Walter Brem on June 16, 1931. Climbing Matthes Crest by traversing the ridge from south to north is a popular alpine climbing activity today.

See also 

 Budd Lake, a lake which is near Matthes Crest
 Cathedral Peak, a mountain fairly near Matthes Crest
 Cockscomb, another mountain fairly near Matthes Crest
 Elizabeth Lake, also fairly near

References

External links 
 Matthes Crest Traverse - South to North. Mountain Project.

Geology of Yosemite National Park
Mountains of Yosemite National Park
Mountains of Mariposa County, California
Mountains of Tuolumne County, California
Mountains of Northern California